Flear is an English surname. Notable people with the surname include:

 Christine Flear (born 1967), French chess player
 Glenn Flear (born 1959), British chess player
 Henry Flear (1818–1852), English cricketer

English-language surnames